Betty Boop for President is a 1932 Fleischer Studios animated short film starring Betty Boop. It was released by Paramount Pictures on November 4, 1932, four days before that year's presidential election day.

Plot

Betty runs for the office of President against Mr. Nobody. Both candidates state their platform through song and dance.

In answer to various problems and political issues, Mr. Nobody consistently promises that "nobody" will solve the problem: 
Who will make your taxes light?... Mr. Nobody!
Who'll protect the voters' right?... Mr. Nobody!
Should you come home some early dawn,
See a new milkman is on:
Who cares if your wife is gone?... Mr. Nobody
Betty's promises for improvements are shown, including door to door trolley stops, improved conditions for keeping the streets clean, and even a giant umbrella to protect the whole city from rain. Betty also promises to tame a split and incorrigible Congress made up of donkey Democrats and elephant Republicans, and offers a simple solution for prison reform: she will transform each hardened criminal into a limp-wristed sissy.

Betty's campaign promises win the crowd over, and she is voted into the White House by a landslide. A large parade is held in the new President's honor, as she thanks one and all.

Notes and comments
 Betty Boop briefly morphs into caricatures of Herbert Hoover and Al Smith. Smith was the Democratic Party candidate in 1928 and was widely expected to run again, but the nominee would end up being Franklin D. Roosevelt. The use of Smith in the cartoon was probably the result in the lead time needed to animate the cartoon before it appeared in theaters.
 The cartoon ends with the image of a glass of beer; repeal or modification of Prohibition in the United States was a major contemporary issue.
Betty Boop for President was reworked by the Fleischer staff sixteen years later, when the studio, by then known as Famous Studios, produced a Popeye the Sailor cartoon entitled Olive Oyl for President. This 1948 short reuses many of the gags, as well as a reworked version of Betty's "If I Were President" song, applying them to a fantasy story about Olive Oyl running for president.
 The "Nobody for President" slogan was later taken up by hippie activist and entertainer Wavy Gravy.
It is the first depiction of a fictional president to appear on screen.
It is the first depiction of a female president in all of fiction.

Remake
There was a compilation film called Hurray for Betty Boop in 1980, based on this short. Record producer Dan Dalton took scenes from over 30 Korean-colored Betty Boop cartoons and wrote a connecting narrative to make this feature. Dalton claimed "it was difficult to keep the continuity" to Fleischer authority Michael Dobbs. Dalton explicitly asserted in 1982 that New Line Cinema's lack of promotion was from the film's failure to receive a theatrical release. It only made its home video release by Warner Home Video in 1984 before it was stored away in obscurity resulting its overwhelmed negative reception. Despite this, Dalton uploaded the abandoned compilation film on social media in March 2016.

References

External links
Betty Boop for President at the Big Cartoon Database
 

1932 films
American political comedy films
Betty Boop cartoons
1930s American animated films
American black-and-white films
1932 animated films
Paramount Pictures short films
Fleischer Studios short films
Short films directed by Dave Fleischer
1930s political comedy films
1932 comedy films
American comedy short films
Films about elections